Patricia Rankin is a British high energy physicist, equity researcher and Chair of the Department at the Arizona State University. Her research considers high energy particle physics and gender balance in scientific disciplines. She was previously responsible for the high energy physics section of the National Science Foundation.

Early life and education 
Rankin is from the United Kingdom. For her high school studies Rankin attended The Queen's School, Chester. Rankin eventually went on to study physics at Imperial College London. In 1978 she was awarded the Governor's Prize for outstanding academic achievement. She remained at Imperial College London for her graduate studies, specialising in high energy particle physics. Her doctoral research considered high energy particle physics. She has said that her professors encouraged her to stay in physics and pursue a research career. After graduating, Rankin moved to the United States. Here she joined the SLAC National Accelerator Laboratory, where she worked as a research associate on SLAC's Mark II detector.

Research and career 
Rankin was appointed to the faculty at the University of Colorado Boulder in 1988, where she was eventually promoted to Professor in 2002. When she joined CU Boulder she was the only woman on the physics faculty. In her early career, Rankin spent two years at the National Science Foundation where she oversaw the high energy physics portfolio.

At the University of Colorado Boulder Rankin created the Leadership Education for Advancement and Promotion (LEAP) programme, which became and institutionalised initiative in 2008. The programme supports pre-tenure and tenured faculty, providing professional development courses in leadership and time management. In 2008 Rankin was awarded an NSF ADVANCE Institutional Transformation Award that looked to increase the representation of women on the physics faculty. Rankin focussed on evidence-based approaches to improve the recruitment and retention of women physicists. In a talk about her gender equality work at Stanford University Rank said, “The time has come for us to admit the failings of the classical system and start thinking like modern physicists. We need to acknowledge that multiple paths may be followed (some more probable than others) and take a quantum mechanical approach that allows people to tunnel into or back into physics careers through classically forbidden regions--like taking extended time off for parental leave,”.She served as the Chair of the American Physical Society Committee on the Status of Women in Physics.

Select publications

Book

Articles

References 

Living people
Year of birth missing (living people)
Alumni of Imperial College London
British women physicists
British physicists
Arizona State University faculty
University of Colorado Boulder faculty
Particle physicists